Tubulin, epsilon 1 is a protein in humans that is encoded by the TUBE1 gene.
This gene encodes a member of the tubulin superfamily. This protein localizes to the centriolar sub-distal appendages that are associated with the older of the two centrioles after centrosome duplication. This protein plays a central role in organization of the microtubules during centriole duplication

References

Further reading